ICCO is an acronym that may refer to:

Interchurch Organisation for Development Cooperation, a Netherlands-based NGO
International Cocoa Organization
Dr. William M. Scholl College of Podiatric Medicine, formerly the Illinois College of Chiropody and Orthopedics